This is a list of unmade and unreleased film, television, and video game adaption based on characters and concepts from Marvel Comics.

Films

Based on Marvel Comics

20th Century Fox

Based on Marvel Comics imprints

Television

Video games

Questprobe featuring The X-Men
In the early 1980s, an 8-bit video game crossover with the X-Men and Questprobe was in development from Adventure International and Scott Adams, but was cancelled when the company went out of business in 1986.

X-Women

In 1995, a video game titled X-Women was a planned follow up to Sega's 1995 Genesis title X-Men 2: Clone Wars. The story would have focused on the female members of the X-Men. Development was cancelled for unknown reasons.

See also 
 List of unproduced DC Comics projects
 List of unproduced Dark Horse Comics projects
 List of unproduced Image Comics projects

References

External links 
 30 Scrapped Marvel Projects Fans Never Got To See on Screen Rant

Unproduced adaptations